The International Vanadium Symposium is a biennial international event. The symposium is an interdisciplinary event for a wide range of chemistry researchers that share interest in vanadium research to network and share ideas. The first meeting of the International Vanadium Symposium occurred in 1997 in Cancun, Mexico, and the most recent meeting was in Montevideo, Uruguay in 2018.

Meetings
1997: Cancun
1999: Berlin
2001: Osaka
2004: Szeged
2006: San Francisco
2008: Lisbon
2010: Toyama
2012: Arlington
2014: Padua
2016: Taipei
2018: Montevideo
2020: Cyprus

Vanadis Award
The Vanadis Award is an international award that is presented to a researcher involved in vanadium research at the International Vanadium Symposium. The award is given to a researcher that has performed innovative research, developed new applications, has a large influence, a wide research scope, and has served for the advancement of vanadium science.

Recipients
2004: Debbie C. Crans
2006: Dieter Rheder
2008: Toshikazu Hairo
2010: Vincent Pecoraro
2012: Israel Wachs
2014: João Costa Pessoa 
2016: Ron Wever and Tamas Kiss
2018: Armando Pombeiro

Notable People 
As of the 11th International Vanadium Symposium meeting, Dr. Dinorah Gambino served as chair. Some notable speakers from the most recent conference (2018) are Debbie C. Crans of Colorado State University, Miguel Bañares of the Spanish National Research Council, Peter Lay from the University of Sydney, Alison Butler of University of California, Santa Barbara, Hiroaki Sasai from Osaka University, and João Costa Pessoa from Universidade de Lisboa.

References

External links

Chemistry conferences
Vanadium